Ajit Pratap Singh (14 January 1917 – 6 January 2000) was an Indian politician of Indian National Congress party from Pratapgarh, who was cabinet minister of Government of Uttar Pradesh (1969–77) and also the member of Lok Sabha twice from Pratapgarh constituency in 1962 and 1980.

Early life and education
Born in the ruling family from princely state of Pratapgarh, established in the 17th century, Raja Ajit Pratap Singh was educated at St. Joseph's College, Allahabad, Senior Cambridge.

Career
He was a member of Uttar Pradesh Legislative Assembly from 1946–52 and again 1967–77, during this period he was Cabinet Minister in the Government of Uttar Pradesh 1969–77. Thereafter remained member of the Rajya Sabha, 1958–62. He was elected to the 3rd Lok Sabha, 1962–67 (this time as a Jan Sangh candidate, opposing Congress), later he joined Congress and was elected again to the 7th Lok Sabha in 1980.

He was the Minister for Excise 1985, Minister for Excise and Forests 1988, Deputy Chairman of the State Planning Commission, Uttar Pradesh 1986–1988.

He was the President of the British India Association (Avadh) 1998/2000, Secretary-cum-Manager for the Colvin Taluqdars' College, Lukhnow, 1998-2000

In 1991, his son Abhay Pratap Singh, was elected from the same constituency from Janata Dal.

Social work 
He was Manager and Founder Member, P. B. Degree College, Pratapgarh; Manager, P. B. Inter College; Donated three hospitals to District Board, Pratapgarh and Member, Managing Committee, Colvin Taluqdars College, Lucknow.

References

People from Pratapgarh, Uttar Pradesh
2000 deaths
Indian National Congress politicians
India MPs 1962–1967
India MPs 1980–1984
Uttar Pradesh MLAs 1967–1969
Uttar Pradesh MLAs 1969–1974
Uttar Pradesh MLAs 1974–1977
Rajya Sabha members from Uttar Pradesh
State cabinet ministers of Uttar Pradesh
1917 births
Lok Sabha members from Uttar Pradesh
Founders of Indian schools and colleges
Indian philanthropists
Bharatiya Jana Sangh politicians